This is a survey of the postage stamps and postal history of the Tanganyika under British mandate.

First stamps

The first postage stamps of Tanganyika were stamps of the East Africa and Uganda Protectorates overprinted "G.E.A." (for German East Africa), used in 1921 and 1922. These are superficially identical to the last occupation issues of German East Africa, but the presence of the "Crown and Script CA" watermark shows they were issued after the civil administration took over from the military, and are thus properly considered the first issues of Tanganyika.

Later issues
In 1922, the government issued a series of 19 stamps inscribed "TANGANYIKA", featuring the head of a giraffe, denominated in cents, shillings and pounds (100 cents to a shilling, 20 shillings to a pound), with several colour changes in 1925.  The changes were because there were many power changes, with each leader wanting a different color.

This was followed in 1927 by a second series of 16 values in a more conventional design with a profile of King George V and inscribed "MANDATED TERRITORY OF TANGANYIKA".

In 1927, Tanganyika entered the Customs Union of Kenya and Uganda, as well as the East African Postal Union. Between 1935 and 1963, stamps of the combined postal administration (East African Posts and Telecommunications Administration) inscribed "Kenya, Uganda, Tanganyika" were in use.

Independence

Shortly after independence in 1961, the new state of Tanganyika issued a series of commemorative stamps inscribed "TANGANYIKA".

This was followed by a final commemorative issue on December 9, 1962, with four stamps inscribed "JAMHURI YA TANGANYIKA" ("Republic of Tanganyika") to commemorate the founding of the republic.

Tanganyika ceased to exist as a nation in 1964, when it was loosely united with Zanzibar, to form the nation of Tanzania. Stamps of the East African postal administration remained valid until well after the formation of Tanzania.

Sources

 Stanley Gibbons Ltd: various catalogues
Rossiter, Stuart & John Flower. The Stamp Atlas. London: Macdonald, 1986. 
 Encyclopaedia of Postal Authorities

Further reading
 Colley, Bill. East African Airmails to 1939. Hassocks: Pier Point Publishing, 1994 120p.
 Goldberg, Larry. Identifying the Cancellations of Tanganyika: A Post Office Identification Handbook. Buffalo Grove, IL.: LMG Communications, Inc., 2001  62p.
 Mackay, James A. East Africa: The Story of East Africa and its Stamps. London: Philatelic Publishers, Ltd., 1970 192p. Series Title: Collecta handbook ; no. 5.
 Proud, Edward B. The Postal History of Tanganyika, 1915-1961. Heathfield, E. Sussex: Proud-Bailey Co., Ltd., 1989  287p.

Communications in Tanzania
Tanganyika
Philately of Tanzania